1971–72 was the 25th season of the Western International Hockey League.

Standings

 Spokane Jets			48		33	13	 2				235	163		 68
 Nelson Maple Leafs 		48		21	22	 5				213	191		 47
 Kimberley Dynamiters		48		20	25	 3				172	184		 43
 Cranbrook Royals		48		20	26	 2				173	192		 42
 Trail Smoke Eaters		48		18	26	 4				162	225		 40

Playoffs
In the "best of 7" semi-finals:
 Spokane Jets defeated Cranbrook Royals 4 games to 3 (4-2, 6-3, 7-4, 4-7, 5-1*, 2-4, 4-0)
 Nelson Maple Leafs defeated Kimberley Dynamiters 4 games to 2 (2-7, 6-2, 4-1, 3-6, 5-2, 7-2)

The Cranbrook Royals successfully protested against their loss in the 5th game in the series, resulting in the game being awarded to Cranbrook.

In the "best of 7" final series, the Spokane Jets defeated Nelson Maple Leafs 4 games to 1 (5-3, 5-4, 5-2, 2-3, 5-4). The Spokane Jets advanced to the 1971-72 Western Canada Allan Cup Playoffs.

References 

Spokane Daily Chronicle - March 1, 1972

Western International Hockey League seasons
Wihl
Wihl